Bob Johnston (29 August 1929 – 15 December 2012) was an Australian rules footballer who played with Melbourne in the Victorian Football League (VFL).

Notes

External links 

Bob Johnston on Demonwiki

1929 births
2012 deaths
Australian rules footballers from Victoria (Australia)
Melbourne Football Club players